Redfield Township is a township in Spink County, South Dakota, USA.  As of the 2000 census, its population was 358.

The township is not to be confused with the city of Redfield, which is a separate political subdivision in the county.

References

Townships in Spink County, South Dakota
Townships in South Dakota